The Delhi Sultanate, or the Sultanate of Delhi, was a Muslim empire based in Delhi that stretched over large parts of the Indian subcontinent during the period of Medieval India, for 320 years (1206–1526). Following the invasion of South Asia by the Ghurid dynasty, five unrelated heterogeneous dynasties ruled over the Delhi Sultanate sequentially: the Mamluk dynasty (1206–1290), the Khalji dynasty (1290–1320), the Tughlaq dynasty (1320–1414), the Sayyid dynasty (1414–1451), and the Lodi dynasty (1451–1526). It covered large swaths of territory in modern-day India, Pakistan, and Bangladesh as well as some parts of southern Nepal.

The foundation of the Sultanate was laid by the Ghurid conqueror Muhammad Ghori who routed the Rajput Confederacy led by Ajmer ruler Prithviraj Chauhan in 1192 near Tarain, after suffering a reverse against them earlier. As a successor to the Ghurid dynasty, the Delhi Sultanate was originally one among a number of principalities ruled by the Turkic slave-generals of Muhammad Ghori, including Yildiz, Aibak and Qubacha, that had inherited and divided the Ghurid territories amongst themselves. After a long period of infighting, the Mamluks were overthrown in the Khalji revolution, which marked the transfer of power from the Turks to a heterogeneous Indo-Muslim nobility. Khalji and Tughlaq rule saw a new wave of rapid Muslim conquests deep into South India. The sultanate finally reached the peak of its geographical reach during the Tughlaq dynasty, occupying most of the Indian subcontinent under Muhammad bin Tughluq. This was followed by decline due to Hindu reconquests, Hindu kingdoms such as the Vijayanagara and Mewar asserting independence, and new Muslim sultanates such as the Bengal and Bahmani Sultanates breaking off. In 1526, the Sultanate was conquered and succeeded by the Mughal Empire.

The establishment of the Sultanate drew the Indian subcontinent more closely into international and multicultural Islamic social and economic networks.(as seen concretely in the development of the Hindustani language and Indo-Islamic architecture), being one of the few powers to repel attacks of the Mongols (from the Chagatai Khanate) and for enthroning one of the few female rulers in Islamic history, Razia Sultan, who reigned from 1236 to 1240. Bakhtiyar Khalji's annexations involved a large-scale desecration of Hindu and Buddhist temples (contributing to the decline of Buddhism in East India and Bengal), and the destruction of universities and libraries. Mongolian raids on West and Central Asia set the scene for centuries of migration of fleeing soldiers, intelligentsia, mystics, traders, artists, and artisans from those regions into the subcontinent, thereby establishing Islamic culture there.

History

Background

The rise of the Delhi Sultanate in India was part of a wider trend affecting much of the Asian continent, including the whole of southern and western Asia: the influx of nomadic Turkic peoples from the Central Asian steppes. This can be traced back to the 9th century when the Islamic Caliphate began fragmenting in the Middle East, where Muslim rulers in rival states began enslaving non-Muslim nomadic Turks from the Central Asian steppes and raising many of them to become loyal military slaves called Mamluks. Soon, Turks were migrating to Muslim lands and becoming Islamicized. Many of the Turkic Mamluk slaves eventually rose up to become rulers, and conquered large parts of the Muslim world, establishing Mamluk Sultanates from Egypt to present-day Afghanistan, before turning their attention to the Indian subcontinent.

It is also part of a longer trend predating the spread of Islam. Like other settled, agrarian societies in history, those in the Indian subcontinent have been attacked by nomadic tribes throughout its long history. In evaluating the impact of Islam on the subcontinent, one must note that the northwestern subcontinent was a frequent target of tribes raiding from Central Asia in the pre-Islamic era. In that sense, the Muslim intrusions and later Muslim invasions were not dissimilar to those of the earlier invasions during the 1st millennium.

By 962 AD, Hindu and Buddhist kingdoms in South Asia faced a series of raids from Muslim armies from Central Asia. Among them was Mahmud of Ghazni, the son of a Turkic Mamluk military slave, who raided and plundered kingdoms in north India from east of the Indus river to west of Yamuna river seventeen times between 997 and 1030. Mahmud of Ghazni raided the treasuries but retracted each time, only extending Islamic rule into western Punjab.

The series of raids on north Indian and western Indian kingdoms by Muslim warlords continued after Mahmud of Ghazni. The raids did not establish or extend the permanent boundaries of the Islamic kingdoms. In contrast, the Ghurid Sultan Mu'izz ad-Din Muhammad Ghori (commonly known as Muhammad of Ghor) began a systematic war of expansion into north India in 1173. He sought to carve out a principality for himself and expand the Islamic world. Muhammad of Ghor created a Sunni Islamic kingdom of his own extending east of the Indus river, and he thus laid the foundation for the Muslim kingdom called the Delhi Sultanate. Some historians chronicle the Delhi Sultanate from 1192 due to the presence and geographical claims of Muhammad Ghori in South Asia by that time.

Ghori was assassinated in 1206, by Ismāʿīlī Shia Muslims in some accounts or by Khokhars in others. After the assassination, one of Ghori's slaves (or mamluks, Arabic: مملوك), the Turkic Qutb al-Din Aibak, assumed power, becoming the first Sultan of Delhi.

Dynasties

Mamluk dynasty (1206–1290)

Qutb al-Din Aibak, a former slave of Mu'izz ad-Din Muhammad Ghori (known more commonly as Muhammad of Ghor), was the first ruler of the Delhi Sultanate. Aibak was of Cuman-Kipchak (Turkic) origin, and due to his lineage, his dynasty is known as the Mamluk (Slave origin) dynasty (not to be confused with the Mamluk dynasty of Iraq or the Mamluk dynasty of Egypt). Aibak reigned as the Sultan of Delhi for four years, from 1206 to 1210. Aibak was praised by the contemporary and later accounts for his generosity and due to this was called with the sobriquet of Lakhbaksh. (giver of lakhs)

After Aibak died, Aram Shah assumed power in 1210, but he was assassinated in 1211 by Aibak's son-in-law, Shams ud-Din Iltutmish. Iltutmish's power was precarious, and a number of Muslim amirs (nobles) challenged his authority as they had been supporters of Qutb al-Din Aibak. After a series of conquests and brutal executions of opposition, Iltutmish consolidated his power. 

His rule was challenged a number of times, such as by Qubacha, and this led to a series of wars. Iltutmish conquered Multan and Bengal from contesting Muslim rulers, as well as Ranthambore and Siwalik from the Hindu rulers. He also attacked, defeated, and executed Taj al-Din Yildiz, who asserted his rights as heir to Mu'izz ad-Din Muhammad Ghori. Iltutmish's rule lasted until 1236. Following his death, the Delhi Sultanate saw a succession of weak rulers, disputing Muslim nobility, assassinations, and short-lived tenures. Power shifted from Rukn ud-Din Firuz to Razia Sultana and others, until Ghiyas ud-Din Balban came to power and ruled from 1266 to 1287. He was succeeded by 17-year-old Muiz ud-Din Qaiqabad, who appointed Jalal ud-Din Firuz Khalji as the commander of the army. Khalji assassinated Qaiqabad and assumed power, thus ending the Mamluk dynasty and starting the Khalji dynasty.

Qutb al-Din Aibak initiated the construction of the Qutub Minar but died before it was completed. It was later completed by his son-in-law, Iltutmish. The Quwwat-ul-Islam (Might of Islam) Mosque was built by Aibak, now a UNESCO world heritage site. The Qutub Minar Complex or Qutb Complex was expanded by Iltutmish, and later by Ala ud-Din Khalji (the second ruler of the Khalji dynasty) in the early 14th century. During the Mamluk dynasty, many nobles from Afghanistan and Persia migrated and settled in India, as West Asia came under Mongol siege.

Khalji dynasty (1290–1320)

The Khalji dynasty was of Turko-Afghan heritage. They were originally Turkic, but due to their long presence in Afghanistan, they were treated by others as Afghan as they adopted of some Afghan habits and customs. After their settlment in India they assimilated into the mass Indian Muslim settlements due to their century long domicile in India since the early Ghorid invasions. The dynasty later also had Hindu ancestry, through Jhatyapali (daughter of Ramachandra of Devagiri), wife of Alauddin Khalji and mother of Shihabuddin Omar.

The first ruler of the Khalji dynasty was Jalal ud-Din Firuz Khalji. He came to power after the Khalji revolution which marked the transfer of power from the monopoly of Turkic nobles to a heterogeneous Indian Muslim nobility. The Khalji and Indo-Muslim faction had been strengthened by an ever-increasing number of converts, and took power through a series of assassinations. Muiz ud-Din Kaiqabad was assassinated and Jalal-ad din took power in a military coup. He was around 70 years old at the time of his ascension, and was known as a mild-mannered, humble and kind monarch to the general public. Jalal ud-Din Firuz ruled for 6 years before he was murdered in 1296 by his nephew and son-in-law Juna Muhammad Khalji, who later came to be known as Ala ud-Din Khalji.

The Alai era saw the emergence of an Indian Muslim state, as Indian Muslims gained power to replace the old nobility. Ala-ud-Din appointed his Indian Muslim relatives such as Nusrat Khan Jalesari as his Grand Vizier and Hizabruddin Zafar Khan as his Minister of War. The Muslim generals of Indian-origin such as Ainul Mulk Multani, Malik Kafur, Malik Nayk, Malik Yak Lakhi and Khusrau Khan emerged as the main conquerors of the Sultanate. This era also saw the preference towards Indian slaves instead of Turkic slaves, as there are hardly any more accounts of Turkic slaves from this era, as the Sultanate attempted to reduce the influence of the deposed Mamluks. Ala ud-Din began his military career as governor of Kara province, from where he led two raids on Malwa (1292) and Devagiri (1294) for plunder and loot. After his accession to the throne, expansions towards these kingdoms were renewed including Gujarat which was conquered by the Indian Muslim Grand Vizier Nusrat Khan Jalesari, the kingdom of Malwa by the Punjabi Muslim general Ainul Mulk Multani,  as well as Rajputana. However, these victories were cut short because of Mongol attacks and plunder raids from the northwest. The Mongols withdrew after plundering and stopped raiding northwest parts of the Delhi Sultanate.

After the Mongols withdrew, Ala ud-Din Khalji continued to expand the Delhi Sultanate into southern India with the help of Gujarati slave generals such as Malik Kafur and Khusro Khan. They collected much war booty (anwatan) from those they defeated. His commanders collected war spoils and paid ghanima (Arabic: الْغَنيمَة, a tax on spoils of war), which helped strengthen the Khalji rule. Among the spoils was the Warangal loot that included the famous Koh-i-Noor diamond.

Ala ud-Din Khalji changed tax policies, raising agriculture taxes from 20% to 50% (payable in grain and agricultural produce), eliminating payments and commissions on taxes collected by local chiefs, banned socialization among his officials as well as inter-marriage between noble families to help prevent any opposition forming against him, and he cut salaries of officials, poets, and scholars. These tax policies and spending controls strengthened his treasury to pay the keep of his growing army; he also introduced price controls on all agriculture produce and goods in the kingdom, as well as controls on where, how, and by whom these goods could be sold. Markets called "shahana-i-mandi" were created. Muslim merchants were granted exclusive permits and monopoly in these "mandis" to buy and resell at official prices. No one other than these merchants could buy from farmers or sell in cities. Those found violating these "mandi" rules were severely punished, often by mutilation. Taxes collected in the form of grain were stored in the kingdom's storage. During famines that followed, these granaries ensured sufficient food for the army.

Historians note Ala ud-Din Khalji as being a tyrant. Anyone Ala ud-Din suspected of being a threat to this power was killed along with the women and children of that family. He grew to eventually distrust the majority of his nobles and favored only a handful of his own slaves and family. In 1298, between 15,000 and 30,000 Mongols near Delhi, who had recently converted to Islam, were slaughtered in a single day, due to a mutiny during an invasion of Gujarat. He is also known for his cruelty against kingdoms he defeated in battle.

After Ala ud-Din's death in 1316, his eunuch general Malik Kafur, who was born to a Hindu family but converted to Islam, assumed de facto power and was supported by non-Khalaj nobles like the Pashtuns, notably Kamal al-Din Gurg. However he lacked the support of the majority of Khalaj nobles who had him assassinated, hoping to take power for themselves. However the new ruler had the killers of Kafur executed.

The last Khalji ruler was Ala ud-Din Khalji's 18-year-old son Qutb ud-Din Mubarak Shah Khalji, who ruled for four years before he was killed by Khusro Khan, another slave-general with Hindu origins, who reverted from Islam and favoured his Hindu Baradu military clan in the nobility. Khusro Khan's reign lasted only a few months, when Ghazi Malik, later to be called Ghiyath al-Din Tughlaq, defeated him with the help of Punjabi Khokhar tribesmen and assumed power in 1320, thus ending the Khalji dynasty and starting the Tughlaq dynasty.

Tughlaq dynasty (1320–1413)

The Tughlaq dynasty was a Turko-Mongol or Turkic Muslim dynasty, which lasted from 1320 to 1413. The first ruler was Ghiyath al-Din Tughlaq. Ghiyath al-Din ruled for five years and built a town near Delhi named Tughlaqabad. His son Juna Khan and general Ainul Mulk Multani conquered Warangal in south India. According to some historians such as Vincent Smith, he was killed by his son Juna Khan, who then assumed power in 1325.

Juna Khan renamed himself Muhammad bin Tughlaq and ruled for 26 years. During his rule, Delhi Sultanate reached its peak in terms of geographical reach, covering most of the Indian subcontinent.

Muhammad bin Tughlaq was an intellectual, with extensive knowledge of the Quran, Fiqh, poetry and other fields. He was also deeply suspicious of his kinsmen and wazirs (ministers), extremely severe with his opponents, and took decisions that caused economic upheaval. For example, he ordered minting of coins from base metals with face value of silver coins - a decision that failed because ordinary people minted counterfeit coins from base metal they had in their houses and used them to pay taxes and jizya.

Muhammad bin Tughlaq chose the city of Deogiri in present-day Indian state of Maharashtra (renaming it Daulatabad), as the second administrative capital of the Delhi Sultanate. He ordered a forced migration of the Muslim population of Delhi, including his royal family, the nobles, Syeds, Sheikhs and 'Ulema to settle in Daulatabad. The purpose of transferring the entire Muslim elite to Daulatabad was to enroll them in his mission of world conquest. He saw their role as propagandists who would adapt Islamic religious symbolism to the rhetoric of empire, and that the Sufis could by persuasion bring many of the inhabitants of the Deccan to become Muslim. Tughluq cruelly punished the nobles who were unwilling to move to Daulatabad, seeing their non-compliance of his order as equivalent to rebellion. According to Ferishta, when the Mongols arrived to Punjab, the Sultan returned the elite back to Delhi, although Daulatabad remained as an administrative centre. One result of the transfer of the elite to Daulatabad was the hatred of the nobility to the Sultan, which remained in their minds for a long time. The other result was that he managed to create a stable Muslim elite and result in the growth of the Muslim population of Daulatabad who did not return to Delhi, without which the rise of the Bahmanid kingdom to challenge Vijayanagara would not have been possible. These were the Urdu-speaking community of North Indian Muslims. Muhammad bin Tughlaq's adventures in the Deccan region also marked campaigns of destruction and desecration temples, for example, the Swayambhu Shiva Temple and the Thousand Pillar Temple.

Revolts against Muhammad bin Tughlaq began in 1327, continued over his reign, and over time the geographical reach of the Sultanate shrunk. Jalaluddin Ahsan Khan, a Sayyid native of Kaithal in North India, founded the Madurai Sultanate in South India. The Vijayanagara Empire originated in southern India as a direct response to attacks from the Delhi Sultanate., and liberated south India from the Delhi Sultanate's rule. In the 1330s, Muhammad bin Tughlaq ordered an invasion of China, sending part of his forces over the Himalayas. However, they were defeated by the Kangra State . During his reign, state revenues collapsed from his policies such as the base metal coins from 1329 to 1332. Famines, widespread poverty, and rebellion grew across the kingdom. In 1338 his own nephew rebelled in Malwa, whom he attacked, caught, and flayed alive. By 1339, the eastern regions under local Muslim governors and southern parts led by Hindu kings had revolted and declared independence from the Delhi Sultanate. Muhammad bin Tughlaq did not have the resources or support to respond to the shrinking kingdom. The historian Walford chronicled Delhi and most of India faced severe famines during Muhammad bin Tughlaq's rule in the years after the base metal coin experiment. By 1347, the Bahmani Sultanate had become an independent and competing Muslim kingdom in the Deccan region of South Asia, founded by Hasan Gangu.

Muhammad bin Tughlaq died in 1351 while trying to chase and punish people in Gujarat who were rebelling against the Delhi Sultanate. He was succeeded by Firuz Shah Tughlaq (1351–1388), who tried to regain the old kingdom boundary by waging a war with Bengal for 11 months in 1359. However, Bengal did not fall. Firuz Shah ruled for 37 years. His reign attempted to stabilize the food supply and reduce famines by commissioning an irrigation canal from the Yamuna river. An educated sultan, Firuz Shah left a memoir. In it he wrote that he banned the practice of torture, such as amputations, tearing out of eyes, sawing people alive, crushing people's bones as punishment, pouring molten lead into throats, setting people on fire, driving nails into hands and feet, among others. He also wrote that he did not tolerate attempts by Rafawiz Shia Muslim and Mahdi sects from proselytizing people into their faith, nor did he tolerate Hindus who tried to rebuild temples that his armies had destroyed. Firuz Shah Tughlaq also lists his accomplishments to include converting Hindus to Sunni Islam by announcing an exemption from taxes and jizya for those who convert, and by lavishing new converts with presents and honours. Simultaneously, he raised taxes and jizya, assessing it at three levels, and stopping the practice of his predecessors who had historically exempted all Hindu Brahmins from the jizya. He also vastly expanded the number of slaves in his service and those of Muslim nobles. The reign of Firuz Shah Tughlaq was marked by reduction in extreme forms of torture, elimination of favours to select parts of society, but also increased intolerance and persecution of targeted groups, the latter of which resulting in conversion of significant parts of the population to Islam.

The death of Firuz Shah Tughlaq created anarchy and disintegration of the kingdom. The last rulers of this dynasty both called themselves Sultan from 1394 to 1397: Nasir ud-Din Mahmud Shah Tughlaq, the grandson of Firuz Shah Tughlaq who ruled from Delhi, and Nasir ud-Din Nusrat Shah Tughlaq, another relative of Firuz Shah Tughlaq who ruled from Firozabad, which was a few miles from Delhi. The battle between the two relatives continued until Timur's invasion in 1398. Timur, also known as Tamerlane in Western scholarly literature, was the Turkicized Mongol ruler of the Timurid Empire. He became aware of the weakness and quarreling of the rulers of the Delhi Sultanate, so he marched with his army to Delhi, plundering and killing all the way. Estimates for the massacre by Timur in Delhi range from 100,000 to 200,000 people. Timur had no intention of staying in or ruling India. He looted the lands he crossed, then plundered and burnt Delhi. Over five days, Timur and his army raged a massacre. Then he collected wealth, captured women, and enslaved people (particularly skilled artisans), and returning with this loot to Samarkand. The people and lands within the Delhi Sultanate were left in a state of anarchy, chaos, and pestilence. Nasir ud-Din Mahmud Shah Tughlaq, who had fled to Gujarat during Timur's invasion, returned and nominally ruled as the last ruler of Tughlaq dynasty, as a puppet of various factions at the court.

Sayyid dynasty (1414–1450)

The Sayyid dynasty ruled the Delhi Sultanate from 1415 to 1451, as a vassal of the Timurid Empire. A contemporary writer Yahya Sirhindi mentions in his Takhrikh-i-Mubarak Shahi that the founder of the dynasty Khizr Khan was a descendant of prophet Muhammad. However, according to Richard M. Eaton, Khizr Khan was a Punjabi chieftain. The Timurid invasion and plunder had left the Delhi Sultanate in shambles, and little is known about the rule by the Sayyid dynasty. Annemarie Schimmel notes the first ruler of the dynasty as Khizr Khan, who assumed power by claiming to represent Timur. His authority was questioned even by those near Delhi. His successor was Mubarak Khan, who renamed himself Mubarak Shah and unsuccessfully tried to regain lost territories in Punjab from Khokhar warlords.

With the power of the Sayyid dynasty faltering, Islam's history on the Indian subcontinent underwent a profound change, according to Schimmel. The previously dominant Sunni sect of Islam became diluted, alternate Muslim sects such as Shia rose, and new competing centers of Islamic culture took roots beyond Delhi.

In course of the late Sayyid dynasty, the Delhi Sultanate shrank until it became a minor power. By the time of the last Sayyid ruler, Alam Shah (whose name translated to "king of the world"), this resulted in a common northern Indian witticism, according to which the "kingdom of the king of the world extends from Delhi to Palam", i.e. merely . Historian Richard M. Eaton noted that this saying showcased how the "once-mighty empire had literally become a joke". The Sayyid dynasty was displaced by the Lodi dynasty in 1451, however, resulting in a resurgence of the Delhi Sultanate.

Lodi dynasty (1451–1526)

The Lodi dynasty was an Afghan, or Turco-Afghan dynasty, related to the Pashtun (Afghan) Lodi tribe.  The founder of the dynasty, Bahlul Khan Lodi, was a Khalji of the Lodi clan. He started his reign by attacking the Muslim Jaunpur Sultanate to expand the influence of the Delhi Sultanate, and was partially successful through a treaty. Thereafter, the region from Delhi to Varanasi (then at the border of Bengal province), was back under influence of Delhi Sultanate.

After Bahlul Lodi died, his son Nizam Khan assumed power, renamed himself Sikandar Lodi and ruled from 1489 to 1517. One of the better known rulers of the dynasty, Sikandar Lodi expelled his brother Barbak Shah from Jaunpur, installed his son Jalal Khan as the ruler, then proceeded east to make claims on Bihar. The Muslim governors of Bihar agreed to pay tribute and taxes, but operated independent of the Delhi Sultanate. Sikandar Lodi led a campaign of destruction of temples, particularly around Mathura. He also moved his capital and court from Delhi to Agra, an ancient Hindu city that had been destroyed during the plunder and attacks of the early Delhi Sultanate period. Sikandar thus erected buildings with Indo-Islamic architecture in Agra during his rule, and the growth of Agra continued during the Mughal Empire, after the end of the Delhi Sultanate.

Sikandar Lodi died a natural death in 1517, and his second son Ibrahim Lodi assumed power. Ibrahim did not enjoy the support of Afghan and Persian nobles or regional chiefs. Ibrahim attacked and killed his elder brother Jalal Khan, who was installed as the governor of Jaunpur by his father and had the support of the amirs and chiefs. Ibrahim Lodi was unable to consolidate his power, and after Jalal Khan's death, the governor of Punjab, Daulat Khan Lodi and Rana Sanga, reached out to the Mughal Babur and invited him to attack the Delhi Sultanate. Babur defeated and killed Ibrahim Lodi in the Battle of Panipat in 1526. The death of Ibrahim Lodi ended the Delhi Sultanate, and the Mughal Empire replaced it.

Government and politics
The historian Peter Jackson explains in The New Cambridge History of Islam: "The elite of the early Delhi sultanate comprised overwhelmingly first generation immigrants from Persia and Central Asia: Persians (‘Tājīks’), Turks, Ghūrīs and also Khalaj from the hot regions (garmsīr) of modern Afghanistan. The Alai era saw the overthrow of the old nobility of early Mamluk rule. The backbone of the Turkic elite was broken as their wealth in Delhi was confiscated by Nusrat Khan Jalesari, after which a new heterogeneous Indo-Muslim nobility emerged in the Delhi Sultanate.

Political system

Medieval scholars such as Isami and Barani suggested that the prehistory of the Delhi Sultanate lay in the Ghaznavid state and that its ruler, Mahmud Ghaznavi, provided the foundation and inspiration integral in the making of the Delhi regime. The Mongol and infidel Hindus were the great "Others" in these narratives and the Persianate and class conscious, aristocratic virtues of the ideal state were creatively memorialized in the Ghaznavid state, now the templates for the Delhi Sultanate. Cast within a historical narrative it allowed for a more self-reflective, linear rooting of the Sultanate in the great traditions of Muslim statecraft. Over time, successive Indo-Muslim dynasties created a 'centralized structure in the Persian tradition whose task was to mobilize human and material resources for the ongoing armed struggle against both Mongol and Hindu infidels'. The monarch was not the Sultan of the Hindus or of, say, the people of Haryana, rather in the eyes of the Sultanate's chroniclers, the Muslims constituted what in more recent times would be termed a "Staatsvolk". For many Muslim observers, the ultimate justification for any ruler within the Islamic world was the protection and advancement of the faith. For the Sultans, as for their Ghaznavid and Ghurid predecessors, this entailed the suppression of heterodox Muslims, and Firuz Shah attached some importance to the fact that he had acted against the ashab-i ilhad-u ibahat (deviators and latitudinarians). It also involved plundering, and extorting tribute from, independent Hindu principalities. Firuz Shah, who finally believed that India was a Muslim country, declared that "no zimmi living in a Musalman country might dare to act".

The Hindu polytheists who submitted to Islamic rule qualified as "protected peoples" according to the wide spectrum of the educated Muslim community within the subcontinent. The balance of the evidence is that in the latter half of the fourteenth century, if not before, the jizyah was definitely levied as a discriminatory tax on non-Muslims, although even then it is difficult to see how such a measure could have been enforced outside the principal centres of Muslim authority. The Delhi Sultanate also continued the governmental conventions of the previous Hindu polities, claiming paramountcy of some of its subjects rather than exclusive supreme control. Accordingly, it did not interfere with the autonomy and military of certain conquered Hindu rulers, and freely included Hindu vassals and officials.

Economic policy and administration

The economic policy of the Delhi Sultanate was characterized by greater government involvement in the economy relative to the Classical Hindu dynasties, and increased penalties for private businesses that broke government regulations. Alauddin Khalji replaced the private markets with four centralized government-run markets, appointed a "market controller", and implemented strict price controls on all kinds of goods, "from caps to socks; from combs to needles; from vegetables, soups, sweetmeats to chapatis" (according to Ziauddin Barani [c. 1357]). The price controls were inflexible even during droughts. Capitalist investors were completely banned from participating in horse trade, animal and slave brokers were forbidden from collecting commissions, and private merchants were eliminated from all animal and slave markets. Bans were instituted against hoarding and regrating, granaries were nationalized and limits were placed on the amount of grain that could be used by cultivators for personal use.

Various licensing rules were imposed. Registration of merchants was required, and expensive goods such as certain fabrics were deemed "unnecessary" for the general public and required a permit from the state to be purchased. These licenses were issued to amirs, maliks, and other important persons in government. Agricultural taxes were raised to 50%.

Traders regarded the regulations as burdensome, and violations were severely punished, leading to further resentment among the traders. A network of spies was instituted to ensure the implementation of the system; even after price controls were lifted after Khalji's death, Barani claims that the fear of his spies remained, and that people continued to avoid trading in expensive commodities.

Social policies

The sultanate enforced Islamic religious prohibitions of anthropomorphic representations in art.

Military
The army of the Delhi sultans initially consisted of nomadic Turkic Mamluk military slaves belonging to Muhammad of Ghor.

The Alai era ended the Turkic monopoly over the state. The army of the Alai era of the Delhi Sultanate had an Indian military style of warfare which had replaced the Ilbari Mamluk style. There are hardly any more references to newly recruited Turkic slaves in historical accounts, and Indian slaves were preferred towards the end of the 1200s, as the new nobility wished to reduce the power of the Turkic slaves after the overthrow of the Mamluks.

A major military contribution of the Delhi Sultanate was their successful campaigns in repelling the Mongol Empire's invasions of India, which could have been devastating for the Indian subcontinent, like the Mongol invasions of China, Persia and Europe. Were it not for the Delhi Sultanate, it is possible that the Mongol Empire may have been successful in invading India. The strength of the armies changes according to time.

Economy 

Many historians argue that the Delhi Sultanate was responsible for making India more multicultural and cosmopolitan. The establishment of the Delhi Sultanate in India has been compared to the expansion of the Mongol Empire, and called "part of a larger trend occurring throughout much of Eurasia, in which nomadic people migrated from the steppes of Inner Asia and became politically dominant".

According to Angus Maddison, between the years 1000 and 1500, India's GDP, of which the sultanates represented a significant part, grew nearly 80% to $60.5 billion in 1500; in comparison, there was no GDP growth in India during the prior 1,000 years. According to Maddison's estimates, India's population also grew by nearly 50% in the same time period.

The Delhi Sultanate period coincided with a greater use of mechanical technology in the Indian subcontinent. While India previously already had sophisticated agriculture, food crops, textiles, medicine, minerals, and metals, it was not as sophisticated as the Islamic world or China in terms of mechanical technology. While there is evidence of water wheels existing in India prior to the Delhi Sultinate, there is no evidence of India previously having water-raising wheels that used gears, or other machines with gears, pulleys, cams or cranks. These mechanical devices were introduced from the Islamic world to India from the 13th century onwards. Later, Mughal emperor Babur provided a description on the use of water-wheels in the Delhi Sultanate.

According to historians Arnold Pacey and Irfan Habib, the spinning wheel was introduced to India from Iran during the Delhi Sultanate. Smith and Cothren suggested that it was invented in India during the latter half of the first millennium, but Pacey and Habib said these early references to cotton spinning are vague and do not clearly identify a wheel, but more likely refer to hand spinning. The earliest unambiguous reference to a spinning wheel in India is dated to 1350. The worm gear roller cotton gin was invented in the thirteenth or fourteenth centuries; Habib states that the development likely occurred in peninsular India, before becoming more widespread across India during the Mughal era. The incorporation of the crank handle in the cotton gin appeared sometime during the late Delhi Sultanate or the early Mughal Empire.

Paper had reached some parts of India as early as the 6th or 7th century, initially through Chinese travellers, but paper failed to catch on as palmyra leaves and birch bark remained far more popular. Paper use only became widespread across Northern India during the 13th century, and then Southern India between the 15th and 16th centuries. Prior to the Delhi Sultanate, papermaking in the Indian subcontinent was largely limited to northwestern regions that were either under Muslim rule (the Sindh and Punjab regions) or had Muslim traders (Gujarat). Paper manufacturing eventually became widespread across Northern India following the establishment of the Delhi Sultanate in the 13th century, and eventually spread across Southern India between the 15th and 16th centuries. On the other hand, paper may have arrived in Bengal from a separate route, as 15th century Chinese traveler Ma Huan remarked that Bengali paper was white and made from "bark of a tree" similar to the Chinese method of papermaking (as opposed to the Middle-Eastern method of using rags and waste material), suggesting a direct route from China for the arrival of paper in Bengal.

Society

Demographics

According to one set of the very uncertain estimates of modern historians, the total Indian population had largely been stagnant at 75 million during the Middle Kingdoms era from 1 AD to 1000 AD. During the Medieval Delhi Sultanate era from 1000 to 1500, India as a whole experienced lasting population growth for the first time in a thousand years, with its population increasing nearly 50% to 110 million by 1500 AD.

Culture

While the Indian subcontinent has had invaders from Central Asia since ancient times, what made the Muslim invasions different is that unlike the preceding invaders who assimilated into the prevalent social system, the successful Muslim conquerors retained their Islamic identity and created new legal and administrative systems that challenged and usually in many cases superseded the existing systems of social conduct and ethics, even influencing the non-Muslim rivals and common masses to a large extent, though the non-Muslim population was left to their own laws and customs. They also introduced new cultural codes that in some ways were very different from the existing cultural codes. This led to the rise of a new Indian culture which was mixed in nature, different from ancient Indian culture. The overwhelming majority of Muslims in India were Indian natives converted to Islam. This factor also played an important role in the synthesis of cultures.

The Hindustani language (Hindi/Urdu) began to emerge in the Delhi Sultanate period, developed from the Middle Indo-Aryan apabhramsha vernaculars of North India. Amir Khusro, who lived in the 13th century CE during the Delhi Sultanate period in North India, used a form of Hindustani, which was the lingua franca of the period, in his writings and referred to it as Hindavi.

The officers, the Sultans, Khans, Maliks and the soldiers wore the Islamic qabas dress in the style of Khwarezm, which were tucked in the middle of the body, while the turban and kullah were common headwear. The turbans were wrapped around the kullah(caps) and the feet were covered with red boots. The Wazirs and Katibs also dressed like the soldiers, except they did not use belts, and often let down a piece of cloth in front of them in the manner of the Sufis. The judges and the learned men wore ample gowns (farajiyat) and an Arabic garment(durra).

Architecture 

The start of the Delhi Sultanate in 1206 under Qutb al-Din Aibak introduced a large Islamic state to India, using Central Asian styles. 
The types and forms of large buildings required by Muslim elites, with mosques and tombs much the most common, were very different from those previously built in India. The exteriors of both were very often topped by large domes, and made extensive use of arches. Both of these features were hardly used in Hindu temple architecture and other indigenous Indian styles. Both types of building essentially consist of a single large space under a high dome, and completely avoid the figurative sculpture so important to Hindu temple architecture.

The important Qutb Complex in Delhi was begun under Muhammad of Ghor, by 1199, and continued under Qutb al-Din Aibak and later sultans. The Quwwat-ul-Islam Mosque, now a ruin, was the first structure. Like other early Islamic buildings it re-used elements such as columns from destroyed Hindu and Jain temples, including one on the same site whose platform was reused. The style was Iranian, but the arches were still corbelled in the traditional Indian way.

Beside it is the extremely tall Qutb Minar, a minaret or victory tower, whose original four stages reach 73 meters (with a final stage added later). The surfaces of both are elaborately decorated with inscriptions and geometric patterns; in Delhi the shaft is fluted with "superb stalactite bracketing under the balconies" at the top of each stage. In general minarets were slow to be used in India, and are often detached from the main mosque where they exist.

The Tomb of Iltutmish was added by 1236; its dome, the squinches again corbelled, is now missing, and the intricate carving has been described as having an "angular harshness", from carvers working in an unfamiliar tradition. Other elements were added to the complex over the next two centuries.

Another very early mosque, begun in the 1190s, is the Adhai Din Ka Jhonpra in Ajmer, Rajasthan, built for the same Delhi rulers, again with corbelled arches and domes. Here Hindu temple columns (and possibly some new ones) are piled up in threes to achieve extra height. Both mosques had large detached screens with pointed corbelled arches added in front of them, probably under Iltutmish a couple of decades later. In these the central arch is taller, in imitation of an iwan. At Ajmer the smaller screen arches are tentatively cusped, for the first time in India.

By around 1300 true domes and arches with voussoirs were being built; the ruined Tomb of Balban (d. 1287) in Delhi may be the earliest survival. The Alai Darwaza gatehouse at the Qutb complex, from 1311, still shows a cautious approach to the new technology, with very thick walls and a shallow dome, only visible from a certain distance or height. Bold contrasting colours of masonry, with red sandstone and white marble, introduce what was to become a common feature of Indo-Islamic architecture, substituting for the polychrome tiles used in Persia and Central Asia. The pointed arches come together slightly at their base, giving a mild horseshoe arch effect, and their internal edges are not cusped but lined with conventionalized "spearhead" projections, possibly representing lotus buds. Jali, stone openwork screens, are introduced here; they already had been long used in temples.

Tughlaq architecture

The tomb of Shah Rukn-e-Alam (built 1320 to 1324) in Multan, Pakistan is a large octagonal brick-built mausoleum with polychrome glazed decoration that remains much closer to the styles of Iran and Afghanistan. Timber is also used internally. This was the earliest major monument of the Tughlaq dynasty (1320–1413), built during the unsustainable expansion of its massive territory. It was built for a Sufi saint rather than a sultan, and most of the many Tughlaq tombs are much less exuberant. The tomb of the founder of the dynasty, Ghiyath al-Din Tughluq (d. 1325) is more austere, but impressive; like a Hindu temple, it is topped with a small amalaka and a round finial like a kalasha. Unlike the buildings mentioned previously, it completely lacks carved texts, and sits in a compound with high walls and battlements. Both these tombs have external walls sloping slightly inwards, by 25° in the Delhi tomb, like many fortifications including the ruined Tughlaqabad Fort opposite the tomb, intended as the new capital.

The Tughlaqs had a corps of government architects and builders, and in this and other roles employed many Hindus. They left many buildings, and a standardized dynastic style. The third sultan, Firuz Shah (r. 1351–88) is said to have designed buildings himself, and was the longest ruler and greatest builder of the dynasty. His Firoz Shah Palace Complex (started 1354) at Hisar, Haryana is a ruin, but parts are in fair condition. Some buildings from his reign take forms that had been rare or unknown in Islamic buildings. He was buried in the large Hauz Khas Complex in Delhi, with many other buildings from his period and the later Sultanate, including several small domed pavilions supported only by columns.

By this time Islamic architecture in India had adopted some features of earlier Indian architecture, such as the use of a high plinth, and often mouldings around its edges, as well as columns and brackets and hypostyle halls. After the death of Firoz the Tughlaqs declined, and the following Delhi dynasties were weak. Most of the monumental buildings constructed were tombs, although the impressive Lodi Gardens in Delhi (adorned with fountains, charbagh gardens, ponds, tombs and mosques) were constructed by the late Lodi dynasty. The architecture of other regional Muslim states was often more impressive.

List of rulers

Destruction and desecration

Cities
While the sacking of cities was not uncommon in medieval warfare, the army of the Delhi Sultanate also often completely destroyed cities in their military expeditions. According to Jain chronicler Jinaprabha Suri, Nusrat Khan's conquests destroyed hundreds of towns including Ashapalli (modern-day Ahmedabad), Anhilvad (modern-day Patan), Vanthali and Surat in Gujarat. This account is corroborated by Ziauddin Barani.

Battles and massacres
 Ghiyas ud din Balban wiped out the Rajputs of Mewat and Awadh, killing approximately 100,000 people. 
 Alauddin Khalji ordered the killing of 30,000 people at Chittor.
 Alauddin Khalji ordered the killing of several prominent Brahmin and merchant civilians during his raid on Devagiri.
 According to a hymn, Muhammad bin Tughlaq is said to have killed 12,000 Hindu ascetics during the sacking of Srirangam.
 Firuz Shah Tughlaq killed 180,000 people during his invasion of Bengal.

Desecration

Historian Richard Eaton has tabulated a campaign of destruction of idols and temples by Delhi Sultans, intermixed with certain years where the temples were protected from desecration. In his paper, he has listed 37 instances of Hindu temples being desecrated or destroyed in India during the Delhi Sultanate, from 1234 to 1518, for which reasonable evidences are available. He notes that this was not unusual in medieval India, as there were numerous recorded instances of temple desecration by Hindu and Buddhist kings against rival Indian kingdoms between 642 and 1520, involving conflict between devotees of different Hindu deities, as well as between Hindus, Buddhists and Jains. He also noted there were also many instances of Delhi sultans, who often had Hindu ministers, ordering the protection, maintenance and repairing of temples, according to both Muslim and Hindu sources. For example, a Sanskrit inscription notes that Sultan Muhammad bin Tughluq repaired a Siva temple in Bidar after his Deccan conquest. There was often a pattern of Delhi sultans plundering or damaging temples during conquest, and then patronizing or repairing temples after conquest. This pattern came to an end with the Mughal Empire, where Akbar's chief minister Abu'l-Fazl criticized the excesses of earlier sultans such as Mahmud of Ghazni.

In many cases, the demolished remains, rocks and broken statue pieces of temples destroyed by Delhi sultans were reused to build mosques and other buildings. For example, the Qutb complex in Delhi was built from stones of 27 demolished Hindu and Jain temples by some accounts. Similarly, the Muslim mosque in Khanapur, Maharashtra was built from the looted parts and demolished remains of Hindu temples. Muhammad bin Bakhtiyar Khalji destroyed Buddhist and Hindu libraries and their manuscripts at Nalanda and Odantapuri Universities in 1193 AD at the beginning of the Delhi Sultanate.

The first historical record of a campaign of destruction of temples and defacement of faces or heads of Hindu idols lasted from 1193 to 1194 in Rajasthan, Punjab, Haryana and Uttar Pradesh under the command of Ghuri. Under the Mamluks and Khaljis, the campaign of temple desecration expanded to Bihar, Madhya Pradesh, Gujarat and Maharashtra, and continued through the late 13th century. The campaign extended to Telangana, Andhra Pradesh, Karnataka and Tamil Nadu under Malik Kafur and Ulugh Khan in the 14th century, and by the Bahmanis in the 15th century. Orissa temples were destroyed in the 14th century under the Tughlaqs.

Beyond destruction and desecration, the sultans of the Delhi Sultanate in some cases had forbidden reconstruction or repair of damaged Hindu, Jain and Buddhist temples. In certain cases, the Sultanate would grant a permit for repairs and construction of temples if the patron or religious community paid jizya (fee, tax). For example, a proposal by the Chinese to repair Himalayan Buddhist temples destroyed by the Sultanate army was refused, on the grounds that such temple repairs were only allowed if the Chinese agreed to pay jizya tax to the treasury of the Sultanate. According to Eva De Clercq, an expert in the study of Jainism, the Delhi Sultans did not strictly prohibit construction of new temples in the sultanate, Islamic law notwithstanding. In his memoirs, Firoz Shah Tughlaq describes how he destroyed temples and built mosques instead and killed those who dared build new temples. Other historical records from wazirs, amirs and the court historians of various Sultans of the Delhi Sultanate describe the grandeur of idols and temples they witnessed in their campaigns and how these were destroyed and desecrated.

See also

 Mongol invasions of India 
 Delhi Sultanate literature
 Iconoclasm
 Ibrahim Lodhi's Tomb
 Persianate states
 Tomb of Bahlul Lodi
 Turkish slaves in the Delhi Sultanate
 Islam in South Asia

Notes

References

Citations

Sources 

 
 
  
 
 
 

 
 
 
 
 Kumar, Sunil. (2007). The Emergence of the Delhi Sultanate. Delhi: Permanent Black.
 
 .
 Majumdar, R. C., Raychaudhuri, H., & Datta, K. (1951). An advanced history of India: 2. London: Macmillan.
 Majumdar, R. C., & Munshi, K. M. (1990). The Delhi Sultanate. Bombay: Bharatiya Vidya Bhavan.
 "Yale":

Further reading

External links 

 

 
States and territories established in 1206
Empires and kingdoms of India
Former sultanates
Islamic rule in the Indian subcontinent
1206 establishments in Asia
13th-century establishments in India
1526 disestablishments in India
States and territories disestablished in 1526